The Serbin Open was a golf tournament on the LPGA Tour from 1953 to 1957. It was played at the Bayshore Golf Club in Miami Beach, Florida.

Winners
Serbin Open
1957 Fay Crocker
1956 Fay Crocker
1955 Fay Crocker
1954 Babe Zaharias

Serbin Miami Beach Open
1953 Betty Jameson

References

Former LPGA Tour events
Golf in Florida
Recurring sporting events established in 1953
Recurring sporting events disestablished in 1957
1953 establishments in Florida
1957 disestablishments in Florida
Women's sports in Florida